Abdud Dayaan Cassiem (born 1 December 1998) is a South African field hockey player. He competed in the 2020 Summer Olympics.

He attended Bishops Diocesan College and graduated a few years ago. His brother Mustapha Cassiem also is an international hockey player.

International career
He was named the best player at the 2021 Men's Indoor Africa Cup.

Honours

Club

Western Province Hockey
2018 Indoor IPT Men - Leading Goalscorer
2019 Senior IPT (Men's A-Section) - Young Player of the Tournament

International
2021 Men's Indoor Africa Cup - Player of the tournament
2022 Men's FIH Hockey Nations Cup - Best player

References

External links

1998 births
Living people
Field hockey players from Cape Town
Field hockey players at the 2020 Summer Olympics
Field hockey players at the 2018 Commonwealth Games
South African male field hockey players
Olympic field hockey players of South Africa
South African expatriate sportspeople in Germany
Expatriate field hockey players
Male field hockey forwards
Alumni of Diocesan College, Cape Town
Field hockey players at the 2022 Commonwealth Games
21st-century South African people
2023 Men's FIH Hockey World Cup players

2023 FIH Indoor Hockey World Cup players
South African people of Malay descent